Babella ceciriana is a species of sea snail, a marine gastropod mollusk in the family Pyramidellidae, the pyrams and their allies. The species is one of twelve known species in the Babella genus of Gastropods.

Description
The shell reaches a length of 4 mm.

Distribution
This marine species occurs within the Pacific Ocean.

References

External links
 To World Register of Marine Species

Pyramidellidae
Gastropods described in 1958